Lacistema robustum is a species of plant in the Lacistemataceae family. It is endemic to Brazil.

References

External links
 Lacistemataceae Holistic Database @ www.lacistemataceae.org

Endemic flora of Brazil
Lacistemataceae
Least concern plants
Taxonomy articles created by Polbot